The Ligier JS43 was the car with which the Ligier team competed in the 1996 Formula One World Championship. It was driven by Frenchman Olivier Panis, who was in his third season with the team, and Brazilian Pedro Diniz, who moved from Forti.

Overview

Background and design 
The JS43 was an evolution of 's relatively successful JS41, designed by Frank Dernie. However, he, team manager Tony Dowe and majority owner Tom Walkinshaw left the team after ownership problems with Ligier founder Guy Ligier.

Season history 
Despite these losses, the JS43 performed respectably all season, with both chassis and engine the subject of steady development.  Despite season-long complaints about the car's braking performance, Panis took his first and only Grand Prix victory at Monaco, in a race where only three cars finished. It was also Ligier's first win since the 1981 Canadian Grand Prix.

Panis also finished sixth in Brazil and fifth in Hungary, to place ninth in the Drivers' Championship with 13 points. Diniz finished sixth in Spain and Italy, earning two points which placed him 15th in the Drivers' Championship. The Brazilian was also fortunate to escape a serious fire in Argentina.

With a total of 15 points, Ligier placed sixth in the Constructors' Championship.

Ligier used 'Gauloises' logos, except at the French, British and German Grands Prix.

Complete Formula One results
(key) (results in bold indicate pole position)

References

Ligier Formula One cars
1996 Formula One season cars